Grandrieu is a village and commune in the Lozère department in southern France.

Geography
The Chapeauroux forms parts of the commune's north-eastern border.

See also
Communes of the Lozère department

References

Communes of Lozère